Oksøy Lighthouse is a coastal lighthouse in the municipality of Kristiansand in Agder county, Norway. The lighthouse sits on the islet of Oksøy which is located in the Kristiansandsfjorden, just east of the island of Flekkerøya. The lighthouse marks the western side of the main shipping channel that leads inland to the port of the city of Kristiansand. The lighthouse has a racon signal, emitting a morse code "O" (- - -).

The lighthouse was first built in 1832, but it was rebuilt in 1900. The light is a 1st order Fresnel lens which emits a light with an intensity of 4,401,000 candelas. That light can be seen for up to  only on one side of the lighthouse.

See also

Lighthouses in Norway
List of lighthouses in Norway

References

External links
 Norsk Fyrhistorisk Forening 

Lighthouses completed in 1832
Lighthouses in Agder
Listed lighthouses in Norway
Buildings and structures in Kristiansand